Bugs is a 2014 Chinese 3D science fiction disaster thriller film directed by Yan Jia. It was released on October 10.

Story
In the near future, due to huge demand for protein, synthetic protein is rapidly developed around the world. James, a fanatic geneticist, has managed to raise superbugs that can provide high-quality protein at low-cost.
However, the reproduction of the bugs goes out of control. They break out of the tubes, devour scientists, and turn into giant monsters. Numerous monster bugs hankering after men's flesh and blood swarm into the sea.
Meanwhile, there's a rave party going on by the beach, and the participants have no idea the bugs are coming. The bugs keep reproducing and eventually cause a tsunami. The young people enjoying the party suddenly get ripped up and eaten. The bugs turn the beautiful beaches into a horrible sea of blood.
Some guys are bold enough to jump onto the ship where the bug queen is at, hope to end the war by killing it. They know – if they don't succeed, mankind will be doomed...

Cast
Xia Zitong
Zhang Zilin
Eric Wang
Sphinx Ting Yoshi Sudraso and  Casey Burgess

Reception
By October 11, the film had earned ¥7.74 million at the Chinese box office.

References

2014 science fiction films
2010s science fiction thriller films
2014 3D films
Chinese 3D films
Chinese disaster films
Chinese science fiction thriller films